Ibiza Anthems volume 4 is an EP by Bogdan Raczynski.  It was released on Rephlex Records in 1999.

Track listing

References

External links
 

1999 EPs
Bogdan Raczynski albums
Rephlex Records EPs